This is a list of all teams, players and managers who have won the FIFA Women's World Cup tournament since its inception in 1991.

By team 
The 8 Women's World Cup tournaments have been won by four different nations. USA has won the most titles with 4. They are also the current champion, winning the title in 2019. Back-to-back tournaments have been won on two occasions, first by Germany (2003, 2007) and most recently by USA (2015, 2019).

By year 
Participating teams have to register squads for the World Cup, which consisted of 18 players in 1991, 20 players from 1995, up to 21 in 2007, and 23 from 2015 onwards.

By player 
A total of 138 players have been in the winning team in the Women's World Cup. 28 players have won the tournament twice.

By manager 
There have been a total of 7 managers win the Women's World Cup. Jill Ellis is the only manager to win two Women's World Cups. Ellis (Portsmouth, England), along with Anson Dorrance (Bombay, India) are the only managers not born in the country they won the Women's World Cup, however both hold United States nationality.

Silvia Neid was assistant manager to Tina Theune for Germany's 2003 tournament win before lifting the 2007 trophy as manager.

References 

Women's World Cup winners
 
winning players
Lists of women's association football players
Association football player non-biographical articles
Women's World Cup